Eldjárn or Eldjarn is a surname. Notable people with the surname include: 

Halldóra Eldjárn (1923-2008), First Lady of Iceland, 1968-80
Kristján Eldjárn (1916-1982), President of Iceland, 1968-80
Lorentz Eldjarn (1920-2007), Norwegian biochemist
Þórarinn Eldjárn (born 1949), Icelandic writer